Betyuntsy (Bötüŋ) is a rural locality (a selo) and the administrative center of Betyunsky Rural Okrug of Amginsky District in the Sakha Republic, Russia, located  from Amga, the administrative center of the district. Its population as of the 2010 Census was 1,216; down from 1,255 recorded in the 2002 Census.

References

Notes

Sources
Official website of the Sakha Republic. Registry of the Administrative-Territorial Divisions of the Sakha Republic. Amginsky District. 

Rural localities in Amginsky District